Tommy Love Davis (born October 18, 1982) was an American football defensive end who is currently a Defensive Graduate Assistant at North Carolina Tar Heels football. He was signed by the New Orleans Saints as an undrafted free agent in 2006. He played college football at North Carolina.

College career
Davis played college football at North Carolina from 2002 to 2005.

Professional career
Davis was a member of the New York Giants and Washington Redskins after he was signed by the New Orleans Saints as an undrafted free agent in 2006.

In 2011, Davis joined the UNC Chapel Hill football coaching staff as a Defensive Graduate Assistant.

External links
North Carolina Tar Heels bio
North Carolina 2011 Football Yearbook
St. Joseph's Pumas bio

1982 births
Living people
People from Goldsboro, North Carolina
American football defensive ends
North Carolina Tar Heels football players
New Orleans Saints players
New York Giants players
Washington Redskins players
North Carolina Tar Heels football coaches
Saint Joseph's Pumas football coaches